Amy Martin (born November 4, 1974) is an American rower who competed in the 2000 Summer Olympics. She attended Oregon State University, where she began rowing in 1992. She earned a silver medal in the 1999 World Championships, and a bronze medal in 1998. Martin was a member of the U.S. women's eight rowing team that competed in the 2000 Summer Olympics. The U.S. team came in 6th place.

Martin now owns and operates Frontier Outdoors, a worldwide adventure videography company.

References

External links
 
 
 
Olympics profile from Sports Illustrated, Aug. 16, 2000

Olympic rowers of the United States
Rowers at the 2000 Summer Olympics
Living people
Oregon State Beavers rowers
American female rowers
1974 births
21st-century American women